The 1957–58 season was the 56th in the history of the Western Football League.

The champions for the first time in their history were Salisbury, and the winners of Division Two were Poole Town Reserves.

Division One
Division One remained at nineteen clubs after Wells City were relegated the previous season, Poole Town joined the Southern League, and two clubs joined:

Cinderford Town, champions of Division Two
Minehead, fourth in Division Two

Division Two
Division Two remained at eighteen clubs after Cinderford Town and Minehead were promoted to Division One, and two new clubs joined:

Taunton Town Reserves
Wells City, relegated from Division One.

References

1957-58
4